Cururu River may refer to:

Cururu River (Ilha de Marajó)
Cururu River (Tapajós River)